Sherlock Holmes is an Italian 1968 television series featuring Nando Gazzolo as Sherlock Holmes and Gianni Bonagura as Dr. Watson.

The series aired on Secondo Programma from 25 October to 29 November 1968 and is formed by six episodes: the first three episodes adapt The Valley of Fear while the last three episodes adapt The Hound of the Baskervilles. Each episode is about one hour long.

Episodes

External links

Sherlock Holmes on RaiPlay.

Sherlock Holmes television series
1960s Italian television series
1968 Italian television series debuts